Ronald Talley (born February 21, 1986) is a former American football defensive end. He was signed by the Green Bay Packers as an undrafted free agent in 2009. He played college football for the University of Delaware and University of Notre Dame.

Early years
Talley was born on February 21, 1986, in Detroit, Michigan. He grew up in Detroit, Michigan. He attended Renaissance High School in Detroit, where he played high school football. During his junior year in 2002, he recorded 122 tackles. He was named to the Detroit Free Press Division 4 All-State team and the All–Detroit first team as a senior in 2003. During that season, he recorded 80 tackles and five sacks.

Heading into college, he was recruited by the University of Notre Dame, University of Iowa, University of Louisville, Michigan State University, University of Minnesota, and University of Southern California. After receiving scholarship offers from Notre Dame, Iowa, Louisville, and Michigan State, he opted to sign-on to play college football for the Notre Dame Fighting Irish football team.

College career

Notre Dame
As a true freshman at Notre Dame in 2004, Talley was redshirted. However, in 2005, he played in 11 games for the Fighting Irish, starting five games. His first career start for Notre Dame came against Brigham Young, where he recorded seven tackles and one sack. He tallied 23 tackles, one sack, one fumble recovery, and two pass deflections. In the 2006 Fiesta Bowl against Ohio State, he recorded three tackles, a fumble recovery, and a pass deflection. Heading into his sophomore season in 2006, Talley was expected to provide veteran experience alongside fellow defensive ends Victor Abiamiri and Chris Frome, but six games into the season, he left the team. In those games, he recorded 11 tackles. His departure was reportedly mutually agreed upon by the coaching staff, after he was unhappy with his playing time.

Delaware
On December 19, 2006, he announced his intention to transfer to the University of Delaware. As a junior in 2007, he played in 13 games, starting eight of those and recorded 43 tackles and three sacks. The following year, as a senior, he started in all but one game for Delaware and recorded 46 tackles and 3.5 sacks. He was named to the Colonial Athletic Association All–Conference team after the season.

Professional career

Green Bay Packers
After going undrafted in the 2009 NFL Draft, Talley signed with the Green Bay Packers on May 1, 2009. He played in every pre-season game for the Packers that season, recording five tackles, before being waived during final cuts, only to be re-signed to the practice squad. He spent the whole season with the Packers' practice squad. After his practice squad contract expired at season's end, he signed a reserve/future contract with Green Bay. He was waived during final cuts again in 2010, for the second straight season.

Arizona Cardinals
On November 9, 2010, the Arizona Cardinals signed Talley to their practice squad and later re-signed him to reserve/future contract on January 6, 2011. After battling with Kenny Iwebema during training camp for a spot on the Cardinals' 53-man roster, Talley made the team. However, he was waived on September 5, to make room for the recently signed Chester Taylor. However, after clearing waivers, he was signed to their practice squad, only to be promoted to the active roster on September 20. Following the 2011 season, he became an exclusive-rights free agent, but was re-signed on April 16, 2012.

Tampa Bay Buccaneers
On June 13, 2014, he signed a contract with the Tampa Bay Buccaneers.

New York Jets
Talley was signed by the New York Jets on March 4, 2015. He was released on September 5, 2015.

References

External links
Arizona Cardinals bio
Green Bay Packers bio
Delaware Fighting Blue Hens bio
Notre Dame Fighting Irish bio

1986 births
Living people
People from Oak Park, Michigan
Players of American football from Detroit
American football defensive ends
Notre Dame Fighting Irish football players
Delaware Fightin' Blue Hens football players
Arizona Cardinals players
Tampa Bay Buccaneers players
New York Jets players
Green Bay Packers players
Renaissance High School alumni